Vasily Ilyich Lytkin (also known by the pseudonym Illya Vas) was a Soviet Komi poet, translator, linguist,  Finno-Ugrist, Doktor nauk. and member of Finnish Academy of Sciences (1969). He was a laureate of the State Prize of the Komi Autonomous Soviet Socialist Republic.

Lytkin was born in the village of Tentyukovo, near the Komi capital of Ust-Sysolsk (modern-day Syktyvkar) in December 1895.

Lutkin studied in Helsinki and Budapest, and later published a historical analysis of the Komi language. He was the first Komi to study at St. Petersburg University.

In 1933, he was arrested and sentenced to five years, which he spent in the  gulag labor camp. In 1956, he was fully rehabilitated. He researched the role of Stephen of Perm and published poetry under the pseudonym Illya Vas.

Lytkin published 11 monographs and over 300 scientific articles.

Starting in 1958, he was a member of the Union of Soviet Writers. He translated the works of Pushkin, Tyutchev, Mayakovsky, Demyan Bedny, Chukovsky into the Komi language.

Lytkin died on August 27, 1981 in Moscow.

References

External links
 archives-ouvertes.fr Vasili Lytkin and the latinisation of Komi

1895 births
1981 deaths
Komi language
Russian Finno-Ugrists
Linguists from the Soviet Union
Moscow State University alumni
Gulag detainees
20th-century linguists